Csopak is a village in Veszprém county, Hungary at Lake Balaton. There is a beach in the village.

Economy
Csopak is famous for its wine, usually and traditionally made of olaszrizling: since July 2020, Csopak or Csopaki wine has become a European protected designation of origin (PDO). For folklore and tourism purposes, the wine days are celebrated each year in August.

Twin towns – sister cities

Csopak is twinned with:
 Kavarna, Bulgaria
 Myślenice, Poland
 Ortovero, Italy
 Sovata, Romania

References

External links
Photos of Csopak

Populated places in Veszprém County